Medusa Deluxe is a 2022 British mystery thriller film directed by Thomas Hardiman, starring Clare Perkins, Anita-Joy Uwajeh, Kae Alexander, Harriet Webb, Darrell D'Silva, Luke Pasqualino and Heider Ali.

Cast
 Clare Perkins as Cleve
 Anita-Joy Uwajeh as Timba
 Kae Alexander as Inez
 Harriet Webb as Kendra
 Darrell D'Silva as Rene
 Luke Pasqualino as Angel
 Heider Ali as Gac
 Lilit Lesser as Angie
 Nicholas Karimi as Patricio
 Debris Stevenson as Etsy
 John Alan Roberts as Mosca

Release
The film premiered at the Locarno Festival on 6 August 2022.

Reception
Jonathan Romney of Screen Daily called the film a "flamboyant sign-off to a picture that’s about as far you can get from the short-back-and-sides tradition of British realism", and wrote that the "electric performances, from a super-alert, bristling cast", give a "feel of live event to the action, framed in Academy ratio."

Jojo Ajisafe of Little White Lies called the film a "fun and extravagant murder mystery that shines a light on the beauty of hairdressing whilst leaving audiences guessing in this quick-witted whodunit."

Matthew Joseph Jenner of the International Cinephile Society rated the film 4.5 stars out of 5 and called the film a "masterpiece of carefully controlled chaos and "one of the more impressive directorial debuts of recent years."

Marisa Mirabal of IndieWire graded the film a "B-" and called it a "flamboyant and alluring film that leaves audiences guessing until the very end about not only who committed the heinous crime but how exactly Hardiman was able to pull off such a visually delightful feature debut."

Guy Lodge of Variety praised the cinematography and the editing, but wrote that the "kinetic if not-quite-novel presentation doesn’t entirely patch over the weaknesses of Hardiman’s script, with its exhausting whirl of characters more colorful than they are shaded, and plotting that eventually runs out of compelling diversions from the matter at hand."

References

External links
 
 

2020s mystery thriller films
2022 films
2022 LGBT-related films
British LGBT-related films
British mystery thriller films
Murder mystery films